Donald Paarlberg (June 20, 1911 – February 14, 2006) was a farmer, author, professor of agricultural economics, and a coordinator of the Food for Peace program.

Education
Paarlberg was born in Oak Glen, Illinois. He received his bachelor of science degree from Purdue University in 1940, his master of science degree from Cornell University in 1942, and his Ph.D. from Cornell University in 1947. He was a professor of agricultural economics at Purdue University from 1946-1952, and from 1961-1969.

Government career
Paarlberg entered government service in 1953. During the Eisenhower Administration he was the economic advisor to the Secretary of Agriculture, Ezra Taft Benson, in the first Republican-managed U.S. Department of Agriculture in more than twenty years. In 1957 Paarlberg became the Assistant Secretary of Agriculture for Marketing and Foreign Agriculture and in late 1958 he was chosen by President Eisenhower to succeed the retiring Gabriel Hauge as Special Assistant to the President for Economic Affairs. Early in 1960 President Eisenhower added the responsibility of coordinator of the newly created Food for Peace program to Paarlberg’s duties. Paarlberg served in this dual capacity until the end of the Eisenhower Administration, at which time he returned to Purdue University as Professor Emeritus.

Books
 Food, co-authored with F.A. Pearson
 American Farm Policy (1964)
 The Great Myths of Economics (1968)
 An Analysis and History of Inflation (1992) 
 The Agricultural Revolution of the 20th Century, co-authored with nephew (2001) Philip Paarlberg 
 [at least five other books]

Personal life
Paarlberg married Eva Robertson in 1940.
One of their two sons was his occasional co-author, Robert Paarlberg.  Mrs. Paarlberg died in 1997.

References

External links
Records of Don Paarlberg, Dwight D. Eisenhower Presidential Library

Cornell University College of Agriculture and Life Sciences alumni
United States Department of Agriculture officials
1911 births
2006 deaths
Purdue University College of Agriculture alumni
Purdue University faculty